Romeo Is Bleeding is a 1993 neo-noir crime thriller film directed by Peter Medak, written and produced by Hilary Henkin, and starring Gary Oldman, Lena Olin, Annabella Sciorra, Juliette Lewis, and Roy Scheider. It follows a psychosexual cat-and-mouse game between a corrupt cop (Oldman), and a ruthless mob assassin (Olin) who begins to unravel his carefully constructed double life. The film's title was taken from a song by Tom Waits.

Released in the United States by Gramercy Pictures, the film was critically unsuccessful and a box office bomb (grossing $3.3 million from a $10 million budget), although its acting has garnered praise.

Plot
Jack Grimaldi is a homicide detective with the NYPD who seems to have everything; a beautiful wife named Natalie, and an adoring teenage mistress named Sheri. However, his lavish lifestyle is funded through extensive corruption, doing favors for Mafia boss Don Falcone in exchange for large cash bribes. His latest task is to reveal the location of Nick Gazarra, a mobster-turned-state's witness protected by federal agents. Gazarra and his protection detail are subsequently killed by a mob hitwoman, Mona Demarkov. Grimaldi is disaffected by this outcome, being uncomfortable with his complicity in the deaths of other law enforcement personnel.

Mona is arrested and Falcone gives Jack a new assignment, to kill Mona, whom he fears could not only testify against him, but be planning to take over his entire operation. Still reluctant about his double life, Jack is assigned as Mona's minder as she is transported to a safe house to await pick-up by federal agents. Upon arrival, Mona quickly seduces and tries to kill him, but their impromptu tryst is interrupted by the arrival of the agents and Jack leaves her to be detained.

Falcone, disappointed in Jack's ineptitude, orders one of his toes amputated. Realizing he has endangered both his wife and mistress, Jack instructs Natalie to leave the city immediately, giving her all the payoff money he has saved as well as instructions of where to meet him out West when the time is right. Jack ends his affair with Sheri and puts her on a train out of the city. Jack tries to hunt Mona Demarkov but is attracted to her sexually and no match for her professionally. Mona offers to pay Jack to help her fake her own death.

Although he obtains false papers for her, she refuses to pay and attempts to strangle Jack. He shoots and wounds her in the arm, then tries to drive away with her handcuffed in the back seat. Mona escapes by hooking her legs around his neck, causing him to crash the car. She slithers out through the shattered windshield without freeing her hands. Mona lures Jack to an empty apartment. He again attempts to kill her but is tricked into shooting Sheri instead. Mona fixes the corpse so as to suggest that it was she, and not Sheri, who died. Mona has Jack abducted and transported to an abandoned warehouse: she handcuffs him to a bed and they have sex. Later Mona forces Jack to assist in burying Falcone alive.

Mona then betrays Jack by turning him into the police, copping a plea deal that will indict Jack for the multiple murders that she tricked him into committing. The police arrange a confrontation between Jack and Mona Demarkov at the courthouse, as he is heading in and she is heading out. She threatens to kill his wife, prompting Jack to grab a gun from the ankle holster of a fellow officer and shoot her dead. He turns the gun on himself, only to discover that the revolver is empty. Instead of being sent to prison for the murder, he is given a commendation. This frees him to begin a new life in the West, under the identity of "Jim Daugherty". The final scene shows Jack living alone in a remote desert town and working at a diner. He longs for Natalie's return and laments the loss of his old life.

Cast
 Gary Oldman as Jack Grimaldi/Jim Daugherty
 Lena Olin as Mona Demarkov
 Annabella Sciorra as Natalie Grimaldi
 Juliette Lewis as Sheri
 Roy Scheider as Don Falcone
 Michael Wincott as Sal
 David Proval as Scully
 Will Patton as Martie
 Tony Sirico as Malacci 
 James Cromwell as Cage 
 Ron Perlman as Jack's Attorney
 Dennis Farina as Nick Gazzara (uncredited)

Production
The film was filmed on location in New York City in Coney Island, Bushwick, Manhattan, and Queens.

Aborted Bon Jovi involvement
Jon Bon Jovi wrote the song "Always" for the film but withheld the track after he was dissatisfied with a preview screening. Bon Jovi in 2004 recalled, "The script was great: the movie wasn't."

Reception

Chicago Sun-Times critic Roger Ebert said that while Oldman is "unsurpassable" in portraying depraved characters, the film is "an exercise in overwrought style and overwritten melodrama, and proof that a great cast cannot save a film from self-destruction." Todd McCarthy of Variety also had praise for the central cast, but called the film a "heavy dose of ultra-violent neo-noir" whose "far-fetched plotting eventually goes so far over the top that [the] pic flirts with inventing a new genre of film noir camp." New York Times journalist Janet Maslin lauded Oldman as a "master craftsman" who gives an "uncanny performance as a slang-spouting American", but concluded, "For all its promise, and for all the brittle beauty of Dariusz Wolski's cinematography, Romeo Is Bleeding eventually collapses under the weight of its violent affectations." A favorable Peter Travers in Rolling Stone called the film a "scorcher of a thriller" with a "knockout performance" by Olin. He added, "It will be a shame if audiences don't get the joke".

In a retrospective review, Dennis Schwartz referred to the film as a "senseless, tasteless and demented postmodern noir", but commended Olin's "menacing" turn as well as the initial interaction between Oldman and Scheider. Randy Miller of DVD Talk wrote, "It's a wild and entertaining ride, to be sure... but not one without its fair share of bumps along the way, and one you probably won't revisit on a regular basis. Still, there's enough here to warrant another look." MSN Movies noted, "While not a great movie – or even a good movie, according to most critics – Gary Oldman's performance as corrupt cop Jack Grimaldi is still highly regarded". Romeo Is Bleeding holds a 27% approval rating on review aggregator Rotten Tomatoes based on 41 reviews, with an average score of 4.7/10.

Year-end lists 
 6th – John Hurley, Staten Island Advance

Awards
Nominee: Best Supporting Actress - Chicago Film Critics Association Awards (Lena Olin)
Nominee: Best Action Sequence - MTV Awards (Lena Olin)

Box office
The film debuted poorly and grossed $3.3 million in the US on a $10 million budget.

References

External links 
 
 
 
 
 
 

1993 films
1993 crime thriller films
1990s American films
1990s British films
1990s English-language films
1990s erotic thriller films
American crime thriller films
American erotic thriller films
American neo-noir films
British crime thriller films
British erotic thriller films
British neo-noir films
Films about the American Mafia
Films directed by Peter Medak
Films scored by Mark Isham
Films set in New York City
Films shot in New York City
Working Title Films films